The Sutherland Curling Club is an historic curling club located in the Sutherland Industrial sector of Saskatoon, Saskatchewan, Canada. 

The Club was founded in 1910 in the village of Sutherland, Saskatchewan. After being rebuilt in 1922, the club was burned down in 1932. The club was rebuilt in 1934 on 112th Street. The club moved to its current location at 141 Jessop Street on 1965. The club currently has six sheets. 

In 2010, skip Darren Camm won the Dominion Curling Club Championships for the club.

External links
Home page

References 

Curling clubs established in 1910
Curling clubs in Canada
Sport in Saskatoon
1910 establishments in Saskatchewan
Curling in Saskatoon
Sports clubs in Saskatchewan